Bianco Bianchi (6 April 1917 – 17 July 1997) was an Italian cyclist. He won the silver medal in Men's team pursuit at the 1936 Summer Olympics.

References

External links
 
 
 
 
 
 

1917 births
1997 deaths
Italian male cyclists
Olympic cyclists of Italy
Olympic silver medalists for Italy
Olympic medalists in cycling
Cyclists at the 1936 Summer Olympics
Medalists at the 1936 Summer Olympics
People from Quarrata
Sportspeople from the Province of Pistoia
Cyclists from Tuscany